Kim Won-ung (8 March 1944 – 30 October 2022) was a South Korean politician. A member of the Democratic Party, the Grand National Party, and the Uri Party, he served in the National Assembly from 1992 to 1996 and again from 2000 to 2008.

Kim died on 30 October 2022, at the age of 78.

References

1944 births
2022 deaths
Democratic Party (South Korea, 1955) politicians
Uri Party politicians
Members of the National Assembly (South Korea)
National Chengchi University alumni
Seoul National University alumni
People from Chongqing
20th-century South Korean politicians
21st-century South Korean politicians